In graph theory, a tree decomposition is a mapping of a graph into a tree that can be used to define the treewidth of the graph and speed up solving certain computational problems on the graph.

Tree decompositions are also called junction trees, clique trees, or join trees.  They play an important role in problems like probabilistic inference, constraint satisfaction, query optimization, and matrix decomposition.

Definition
Thus,  forms a subgraph of the intersection graph of the subtrees. The full intersection graph is a chordal graph.

Each subtree associates a graph vertex with a set of tree nodes. To define this formally, we represent each tree node as the set of vertices associated with it.

 The union of all sets  equals . That is, each graph vertex is associated with at least one tree node.
That is, vertices are adjacent in the graph only when the corresponding subtrees have a node in common.
This is also known as coherence, or the running intersection property.

The tree decomposition of a graph is far from unique; for example, a trivial tree decomposition contains all vertices of the graph in its single root node.

A tree decomposition in which the underlying tree is a path graph is called a path decomposition, and the width parameter derived from these special types of tree decompositions is known as pathwidth.

A tree decomposition  of treewidth  is smooth, if for all , and for all .

Treewidth

The width of a tree decomposition is the size of its largest set  minus one. In this definition, the size of the largest set is diminished by one in order to make the treewidth of a tree equal to one. Treewidth may also be defined from other structures than tree decompositions, including chordal graphs, brambles, and havens.

It is NP-complete to determine whether a given graph  has treewidth at most a given variable .
However, when  is any fixed constant, the graphs with treewidth  can be recognized, and a width  tree decomposition constructed for them, in linear time.

Dynamic programming
At the beginning of the 1970s, it was observed that a large class of combinatorial optimization problems defined on graphs could be efficiently solved by non-serial dynamic programming as long as the graph had a bounded dimension, a parameter related to treewidth. Later, several authors independently observed, at the end of the 1980s, that many algorithmic problems that are NP-complete for arbitrary graphs may be solved efficiently by dynamic programming for graphs of bounded treewidth, using the tree-decompositions of these graphs.

As an example, consider the problem of finding the maximum independent set in a graph of treewidth . To solve this problem, first choose one of the nodes of the tree decomposition to be the root, arbitrarily.

At each node or edge, there are at most  sets  for which we need to calculate these values, so if  is a constant then the whole calculation takes constant time per edge or node. The size of the maximum independent set is the largest value stored at the root node, and the maximum independent set itself can be found (as is standard in dynamic programming algorithms) by backtracking through these stored values starting from this largest value. Thus, in graphs of bounded treewidth, the maximum independent set problem may be solved in linear time. Similar algorithms apply to many other graph problems.

This dynamic programming approach is used in machine learning via the junction tree algorithm for belief propagation in graphs of bounded treewidth. It also plays a key role in algorithms for computing the treewidth and constructing tree decompositions: typically, such algorithms have a first step that approximates the treewidth, constructing a tree decomposition with this approximate width, and then a second step that performs dynamic programming in the approximate tree decomposition to compute the exact value of the treewidth.

See also
Brambles and havensTwo kinds of structures that can be used as an alternative to tree decomposition in defining the treewidth of a graph.
Branch-decompositionA closely related structure whose width is within a constant factor of treewidth.
Decomposition MethodTree Decomposition is used in Decomposition Method for solving constraint satisfaction problem.

Notes

References

. 
.
.
.
.
.
.
.
.

Trees (graph theory)
Graph minor theory
Graph theory objects